FORUM (Far-infrared Outgoing Radiation Understanding and Monitoring) is an Earth observing satellite that is scheduled to launch in 2027.

The FORUM mission is led by the European Space Agency (ESA) and has as its main goal the study of the Earth's radiation budget. It is expected that FORUM's measurements will be improving climate models and offer new insights into the way climate change is affecting the planet.

Background 
On 24 September 2019, ESA announced that FORUM was selected to become the ninth Earth Explorer mission, beating the Sea surface KInematics Multiscale monitoring (SKIM) proposal following a two-year feasibility study phase.

The main scientific purpose of FORUM is to better understand the Earth's radiation budget - the balance between the incoming radiation mostly from the Sun at short wavelengths, and outgoing radiation, which is a combination of reflected radiation from the Sun and radiation emitted by the Earth system, much of it a longer wavelengths - and the way this exchange is affected by the changes in the Earth's atmosphere caused by human activity. FORUM will especially be measuring the long-wavelength outgoing energy, which is strongly influenced by water vapour and thin ice clouds in the Earth's atmosphere. According to available data, about 50 percent of the total energy emitted by the Earth is in this long-wavelength range, but these emissions were not monitored in detail from space until now.

These insights will offer a better understanding of the climatic changes taking place on Earth and improve climate predictions. According to ESA, the FORUM mission was selected over SKIM specifically because it promises to "fill in a critical missing piece of the climate jigsaw".

The mission is scheduled for launch in 2027, and its budget is expected to cost a maximum of 260 million euros.

See also 
 European Space Agency
 Living Planet Programme:
 GOCE
 SMOS
 CryoSat & CryoSat-2
 Swarm
 ADM-Aeolus
 EarthCARE
 FLEX
 BIOMASS

References 

Earth observation satellites of the European Space Agency
Proposed satellites
2027 in spaceflight
Geospace monitoring satellites
European Space Agency programmes